Keith Charles Heinrich (born March 19, 1979) is a former American football tight end. He was drafted by the Carolina Panthers in the sixth round of the 2002 NFL Draft. He was a two-sport star at Sam Houston State, playing football and basketball. 
Heinrich has also been a member of the Cleveland Browns, Miami Dolphins, Tampa Bay Buccaneers, Baltimore Ravens and Florida Tuskers.

College career
While at Sam Houston State, Heinrich was a two-sport star in basketball and football.

Member of the 2000 Southland conference Championship Basketball Team. Member of the 2001 Southland Conference Football Team
-2000 First-team All-Conference  Football 2001 First-team All-Conference Football 2001 First-team All-American Tight End
-Was inducted into the Sam Houston State Hall of Honor.

Professional career
Heinrich was drafted by the Florida Tuskers on the UFL Premiere Season Draft in 2009 and signed with the team on August 17.

References

External links
Just Sports Stats

1979 births
Living people
Players of American football from Houston
American football tight ends
Sam Houston Bearkats football players
Carolina Panthers players
Cleveland Browns players
Miami Dolphins players
Tampa Bay Buccaneers players
Baltimore Ravens players
Florida Tuskers players
People from Tomball, Texas